The 2011–12 Melbourne Stars season was the first in the club's history. Coached by Greg Shipperd and captained by Cameron White, they competed in the BBL's inaugural season.

Season

Ladder

Regular season

Semi-finals

Team information

Squad

Home attendance

References

External links
 Official website of the Melbourne Stars
 Official website of the Big Bash League

Melbourne Stars seasons